Liem Kim Leng (born 1926) was an Indonesian weightlifter. He competed in the men's featherweight event at the 1956 Summer Olympics.

References

External links
 

1926 births
Possibly living people
Indonesian male weightlifters
Olympic weightlifters of Indonesia
Weightlifters at the 1956 Summer Olympics
Place of birth missing